"Daisy Petal Pickin'" is a song written by Keith McCormack, Glynn Thames, and Juanita Jordan and performed by Jimmy Gilmer and the Fireballs.

Chart performance
It reached #5 in Australia and also #15 on the Billboard Hot 100 in 1964.

References

1963 songs
1963 singles
Songs written by Keith McCormack
The Fireballs songs
Dot Records singles